Gulf African Bank (GAB), whose full name is Gulf African Bank Limited, is a commercial bank in Kenya operating under an Islamic banking regime. It is licensed by the Central Bank of Kenya, the central bank and national banking regulator.

 the bank was a mid-sized financial services provider in Kenya. Its total assets were valued at approximately US$191.8 million (KES:19, 753, 647 billion), with customer deposits totalling approximately US$153.3 million (KES:15.8 billion), and shareholders' equity estimated at US$30.6 million (KES:3.15 billion). At that time, the bank was ranked number 25, by assets, out of the 43 licensed banks in Kenya then. The bank has plans to enter Uganda and Tanzania.

History
Discussions to establish the bank started in 2005, by individuals and institutions from the Persian Gulf and Kenya. The bank began banking operations in 2008, after receiving a commercial banking license and authorisation to establish a Sharia bank, from the Central Bank of Kenya. Gulf African Bank is the second commercial bank in Kenya to receive authorisation to practice Sharia banking, after First Community Bank, which opened in 2007. At the time it opened, Gulf African Bank's capital base totalled over US$21 million (KES:1.75 billion).

Ownership
The shares of stock in Gulf African Bank are privately held by institutional and private investors from the Persian Gulf, Kenya and the United States of America. Institutional investors account for over 90% shareholding. The major shareholders in the bank include the investors listed in the table below. In September 2012, the International Finance Corporation acquired 16% shareholding in the bank for US$5 million. It is not clear how the shareholding will look after the money changes hands.

 The totals are off because shareholding data after IFC investment is lacking.

Branch network
, the bank operates a network of branches at the following locations:

 Head Office – Geminia Insurance Plaza, Kilimanjaro Avenue, Nairobi
 Lamu Branch – Old Telkom Office, Jomo Kenyatta Road, Lamu
 Kenyatta Avenue Branch – Ground Floor, Hughes Building, Kenyatta Avenue, Nairobi
 Eastleigh Branch II – Shariff Centre Building, Jam Street, Eastleigh, Nairobi
 Bombolulu Branch – Madina Estate, New Mombasa-Malindi Highway, Bombolulu, Mombasa
 Westlands Branch – 9 West Building, Westlands, Nairobi]
 Enterprise Branch – Addis Ababa Road, Off Enterprise Road, Nairobi
 Upper Hill Branch – Ground Floor, Geminia Ins. Plaza, Kilimanjaro Ave., Upper Hill, Nairobi
 Jomo Kenyatta Branch – Kasa Building, Jomo Kenyatta Avenue, Mombasa
 Malindi Branch – Blue Marlin Building, Lamu Road, Malindi
 Garissa Branch – First House, Al-Waqf Quran House, Kismayu Road, Garissa
 Nkrumah Road Branch – Najat House, Nkrumah Road, Mombasa
 Eastleigh Main Branch – Eastleigh Mall Building, General Wariunge Street, Eastleigh, Nairobi
 Bondeni Branch – Abdel Nasser Road, Bondeni, Mombasa

See also

 CBK
 Kenya Banks
 Kenya Economy
 Sharia Banking
 First Community Bank

References

External links
Website of Gulf African Bank
Website of Central Bank of Kenya
Investor Interest In Sharia-Linked Products Grows
Why Sharia-Compliant Economy Growing Fast

Banks of Kenya
Companies based in Nairobi
Banks established in 2008
Kenyan companies established in 2008